HP-150 (aka HP Touchscreen or HP 45611A) was a compact, powerful and innovative computer made by Hewlett-Packard in 1983. It was based on the Intel 8088 CPU and was one of the world's earliest commercialized touch screen computers. Like other "workalike" IBM PC clones of the time, despite running customized MS-DOS versions 2.01, 2.11 and 3.20, the machine was not IBM PC DOS compatible. Its 8088 CPU, rated at 8 MHz, was faster than the 4.77 MHz CPUs used by the IBM PC of that period. Using add-on cards, main memory could be increased from 256 KB to 640 KB. However, its mainboard did not have a slot for the optional Intel 8087 math coprocessor due to space constraints. An HP-150 with an optional hard disk was called HP Touchscreen MAX.

The computer's screen was a 9-inch Sony CRT surrounded by infrared emitters and detectors which detected the position of any non-transparent object that touched the screen. In the original HP-150, these emitters and detectors were placed within small holes located on the inside of the monitor's bezel (which resulted in the bottom series of holes sometimes filling with dust, causing the touchscreen to fail until the dust was vacuumed from the holes).

Like the original Macintosh, HP-150 was packaged with the CRT display as a single unit, and made use of 3½-inch floppy disks. Unlike the Mac, however, HP-150 had no internal floppy drive; the machine sat atop the phone book-sized 9121D dual 3½-inch floppy (76 mm high, 325 mm wide, 285 mm deep) or similarly sized hard disk devices, connected by HP-IB.

Invisible to the user, the HP 150 runs "Terminal Operating System" ("TOS", code-named "Magic" during development).  This operating system generally runs only two tasks: the terminal emulator and MST (which is Microsoft DOS).

Hardware

Display

Display resolutions:
 Text: 80 columns × 27 lines (720 × 378 pixels)
 Character size: 7 × 10 pixels
 Character cell size: 9 × 14 pixels
 Inherent HP Terminal emulation equivalent to HP 2623 Graphics Terminal
 Bit-map: 512 × 390 pixels
 Separate plane for text and graphics
 Monitor sensor grid: 40 (h) × 24 (v)

HP-150's touch screen sensor grid is quite coarse. Its resolution is only two characters wide. Used mainly for rough cursor positioning and function key control, it could not be used to draw pictures.

Processor unit
 Optional internal thermal printer HP 2647A (fax roll)
 Communication ports:
 Two RS-232 ports (one of them supported RS-422)
 HP-IB (IEEE-488)
 HP-HIL (standard on HP-150 II, but an optional add-on card on HP-150)

Storage
 Supported HP-IB attached storage:

Reception
BYTE in November 1984 called HP-150 "an extremely flexible machine", but "difficult to program".

Successors
The two-CPU HP-120 (aka HP 45600A) Z80 CP/M machine also used the 9121 drives.

HP-150 II (aka HP 45849A) replaced HP-150 in 1984. While still called HP Touchscreen II, the touchscreen was no longer standard, but rather a rarely-adopted option. The optional touchscreen bezel was superior to the original bezel, in that the emitters and detectors were now located behind a solid infrared-transparent plastic; thus removing the need to regularly clean the holes found in the original model.

HP-150 II had the same footprint as HP-150, but came in a larger housing to accommodate its 12-inch screen, but could no longer accommodate an internal printer. HP-150 II had four expansion slots available (as opposed to two), and could accommodate an optional 8087 co-processor board. There were some minor compatibility problems between HP-150 and HP-150 II in the video subsystem.

In 1985, HP introduced the Vectra, which InfoWorld stated was the company "responding to demands from its customers for full IBM PC compatibility". HP repositioned HP-150 as a workstation for the HP 3000 minicomputer.

See also
 List of Hewlett-Packard products
 HP Roman-8

References

Bibliography
 
 
 
 
 
 The Definitive HP150 Catalog. The 1991 Edition. Personalized Software

External links

 HP-150
 Hewlett-Packard HP-150
 HP's Virtual Museum: 6-views of the HP-150
 HP Computer Museum: 100 Series, also HP-150 Software

150
Touchscreens